The Serie B is the second division of women's football in Italy. Established in 1970, it has been run by the Italian Football Federation. The team which finishes Serie B in the top position is promoted directly to the Serie A, the team in the second position enters a promotion/relegation playoff with the second to last placed Serie A team, while the bottom three are relegated directly to the Serie C. Since 2015 it has decreed by the Italian Football Federation all male Serie B teams must provide women's teams also.

References

External links
 

Sports leagues established in 1970
1970 establishments in Italy
women
1